The Soho-class frigates was a class of naval warship in North Korea. The warship used a twin-hulled design, which is unusual for North Korea. As there is only one ship in the class, it is likely that the ship was purely experimental.

In 2014 it was reported that the ship was retired and scrapped in 2009. The new light helicopter-carrier frigate of Nampo-class corvette has been designed as its replacement.

References

 

Frigates of the Korean People's Navy
Frigate classes
Military catamarans